Fissuroderes is a genus of kinorhynchs in the family Echinoderidae.

Species
Fissuroderes higginsi Neuhaus & Blasche, 2006
Fissuroderes novaezealandia Neuhaus & Blasche, 2006
Fissuroderes papai Neuhaus & Blasche, 2006
Fissuroderes rangi Neuhaus & Blasche, 2006
Fissuroderes thermoi Neuhaus & Blasche, 2006

References

Kinorhyncha
Ecdysozoa genera